Bolshoye Yamkino is a rural locality (a village) in Mardengskoye Rural Settlement, Velikoustyugsky District, Vologda Oblast, Russia. The population was 1 as of 2002.

Geography 
Bolshoye Yamkino is located 16 km west of Veliky Ustyug (the district's administrative centre) by road. Polutino is the nearest rural locality.

References 

Rural localities in Velikoustyugsky District